Deutsch-Wagram (literally "German Wagram"), often shortened to Wagram, is a village in the Gänserndorf District, in the state of Lower Austria, Austria. It is in the Marchfeld Basin, close to the Vienna city limits, about 15 km (9 mi) northeast of the city centre.

History 
Wagram was first mentioned in a 1258 tithe register, drawn up when King Ottokar II of Bohemia ruled over the Austrian duchy. It was named after a now silted up meander of the Danube river, where the waves crashed against the shore.

In 1580 the population turned Protestant but was forcefully converted in the Counter-Reformation under the Habsburg emperor Ferdinand II shortly afterwards.

Deutsch-Wagram was the location of the 1809 Battle of Wagram fought between invading French troops under Napoleon and an Austrian army led by Archduke Charles. 

The population rose after the area was connected with the Austrian capital by the opening of the Emperor Ferdinand Northern Railway (the present-day Austrian North Railway) in 1837.  The former village was elevated to the status of a market town in 1929 and received town privileges in 1984. The firearm company Glock was founded here in 1963.

Politics
Seats in the municipal assembly (Gemeinderat) as of 2015 elections:
 Austrian People's Party (ÖVP): 17
 Social Democratic Party of Austria (SPÖ): 7
 wir4dw (independents): 4
 The Greens: 3
 Freedom Party of Austria (FPÖ): 2

Twin towns

Deutsch-Wagram is twinned with:
  Calheta de São Miguel, Cape Verde
  Gbely, Slovakia

Notable people
 Johann Sahulka (1857–1927), electrical engineer
 Thomas Forstner (born 1969), singer

Residents
 Jürgen Melzer, a Vienna-born tennis player

See also
 Princes of Wagram

References

External links 

Cities and towns in Gänserndorf District